The film industry in Western Australia encompasses a wide range of productions and a wide range of filmmakers.

Funding can be sourced from ScreenWest, Screen Australia, FTI, television broadcasters and private investors.

Filmmakers and productions can be recognised at the West Australian Screen Awards.

Feature films 

 Bad Girl (2016)
 Blackfellas (1993)
 Blame (2010)
 Boundaries of the Heart (1988)
 Bran Nue Dae (2009)
 Breath (2017)
 Day of the Panther (1988)
 Dingo (1991)
 Drift (2013)
 A Few Less Men (2016)
 Fran (1985)
 Harlequin (1980)
 Hounds of Love (2016)
 Japanese Story (2003)
 Jasper Jones (2016)
 Kill Me Three Times (2014)
 Last Train to Freo (2006)
 Let's Get Skase (2001)
 Looking for Grace (2015)
 Love in Limbo (1993)
 Mad Bastards (2011)
 The Olive Tree (1975)
 OtherLife (2016)
 Paper Planes (2015)
 Rabbit-Proof Fence (2002)
 The Reckoning (2014)
 Red Dog (2011)
 Red Dog: True Blue (2016)
 Satellite Boy (2012)
 Shame (1988)
 Son of a Gun (2014)
 Stone Bros. (2009)
 Teesh and Trude (2002)
 These Final Hours (2013)
 Thunderstruck (2004)
 Top Knot Detective (2016)
 The Turning (2013)
 Two Fists, One Heart (2008)
 Under the Lighthouse Dancing (1997)
 Wasted on the Young (2013)
 Windrider (1986)
 Zombie Brigade (1988)

Independent feature films 
Feature films made outside of the government funding bodies include:

 The Actress (2005)
 Aussie Park Boyz (2004)
 Aussie Park Boyz: The Next Chapter (2011)
 The Bouncer (2006)
 Broken (2016)
 Broken Contract (2015)
 The Burning Kiss (2017)
 Cherubhead (2021)
 The Course (2007)
 Crush (2009)
 Death Bet (2008)
 The Director's Cut (2009)
 Everybody Gets Stabbed (2020)
 Esoterica (2010)
 Foreshadow (2013)
 I Am Bish (2009)
 Indefinite (2015)
 Infected Paradise (2014)
 Little Sparrows (2010)
 Lurking Woods (2015)
 Needle (2010)
 No Through Road (2008)
 Pinch (2015)
 Plum Role (2007)
 Pulse (2016)
 Raven's Cabin (2012)
 The Sculptor (2009)
 Sororal (2014)
 The Toll (2010)
 Twisted Minds (2014)
 The Wheelchair Warriors (1998)
 White December (2016)

Television movies 

 3 Acts of Murder (2009)
 An Accidental Soldier (2013)
 The Great Mint Swindle (2012)
 Justice (1998)
 Southern Cross (2001)

Feature documentaries 

 Frackman (2015)
 Fridey at the Hydey (2013)
 Hotel Coolgardie (2016)
 Hunter: For the Record (2012)
 Meal Tickets (2016)
 It's Not Just Me (2017)
 Parkerville Amphitheatre: Sets, Bugs and Rock n Roll (2015)
 Putuparri and the Rainmakers (2015)
 Three Hams in a Can (2009)

Television documentaries 

 Bom Bali (2006)
 Chateau Chunder: A Wine Revolution (2012)
 Child Soldiers (2002)
 Gallipoli Submarine (2008)
 The Hunt for HMAS Sydney (2008)
 Jandamarra's War (2011)
 Prison Songs (2015)
 The Secret History of Eurovision (2011)
 Singapore 1942 End of Empire (2012)
 Skippy: Australia's First Superstar (2009)
 Surviving Mumbai (2009)
 Wadjemup: Black Prison White Playground (2014)
 The War on Microbes (2012)

Television and web series 

 Boomtown (2013–2014)
 Castaway (2011)
 The Circuit (2007–2010)
 Cloudstreet (2011)
 Comic Book Heroes (2013)
 Desperately Seeking Sheila (2004)
 Dogstar (2006–2011)
 The Dreamhouse (2014)
 Falcon Island (1981)
 Foreign Exchange (2004)
 Greenfield (2015)
 Harvest (2012)
 The Heights (2019–Present)
 Henry & Aaron's 7 Steps to Superstardom (2011)
 House of Hancock (2015)
 The Legend of Gavin Tanner (2014–2016)
 Lockie Leonard (2007–2010)
 Mal.com (2011)
 Marx and Venus (2007–2008)
 Minty (1998)
 Ocean Star (2003)
 Outback Truckers (2012)
 Parallax (2004)
 Popcorn (2015)
 Railroad Australia (2016)
 The Shark Net (2003)
 Ship to Shore (1993–1994)
 The Sleepover Club (2002–2008)
 Stormworld (2009)
 Streetsmartz (2005–2006)
 Suicidal Balloon (2003)
 Sweat (1996)
 Top Knot Detective (2015–2016)
 Trapped (2008–2009)
 Who Do You Think You Are? (2008–2016)
 The War That Changed Us (2014)
 Wormwood (2007)

Short films 

 Arrivals and Departures (2009)
 The Artifact (2015)
 At Play (2006)
 Bad Credit and Aliens (2001)
 Barrow (2014)
 Before Closing (2007)
 The Belfast Boys (2004)
 Betrand the Terrible (2010)
 The Billabong (2010)
 Black Swan (2003)
 Blue (2009)
 Blue (2012)
 Bogside Boys (2003)
 The Brink (2005)
 Bush Basher (2011)
 Cain Rose Up (2010)
 Cedric & Hope (2012)
 Charlotte (2011)
 Consume This! (2006)
 The Cookie Crumbles (2013)
 Council (2016)
 Crosshairs (2012)
 Crossroad (2008)
 Crush (2001)
 The Dead Wastes (2009)
 Declan (2002)
 Deep End (2009)
 The Dinner Meeting (2012)
 Dogs Run Loose Around Here (2008)
 A Dollar For the Good Ones (2006)
 Edgar and Elizabeth (2007)
 Effective Towel Flicking (2003)
 Every Ute and Its Dog (2002)
 Exposure (2012)
 Factory 293 (2014)
 Fading West (2002)
 Fallout: Lanius (2013)
 The Fan (2013)
 Fastest Shrinking Town (2002)
 Fetch (2002)
 George Jones and the Giant Squid (2011)
 Gifted Thumbs (2002)
 A Girl's Best Friend (2016)
 Good Pretender (2011)
 Goodbye, Cruel World (2012)
 Happy Haven (2010)
 Hello, It's Freo (2009)
 Her Outback (2002)
 The Hunt (2016)
 Iron Bird (2006)
 Jack (2002)
 Junction (2002)
 Kanowna (2010)
 Karroyul (2015)
 Legacy (2008)
 Library of Love (2016)
 Light as a Feather (2010)
 Little Boxes (2009)
 Little Hunters (2002)
 Little Man (2004)
 Lola & Luis (2016)
 Love in a Disabled Toilet (2015)
 Love Like You've Never Been Hurt (2009)
 Mamani (2016)
 Man (2014)
 Matchbox (2002)
 Medusa (2003)
 Men's Room (2002)
 My Love Lilac (2015)
 My Uncle Bluey (2009)
 No School No Pool (2002)
 One Night Only (2012)
 OnO (2016)
 The Owl (2013)
 The Paddock (2003)
 Pale Blue Eyes (2014)
 Perished (2011)
 Pilbara Pearl (1999)
 The Planet Lonely (2008)
 Polarised (2012)
 Postie (2003)
 Professor Pebbles (2008)
 Rat Tale (2014)
 Reflection (2016)
 Reflections (2005)
 Restare Uniti (2011)
 Revive (2013)
 Rock and Roll Mud Wrestling (2009)
 Ronan's Escape (2010)
 Set Yourself Free (2014)
 Setting Them Straight (2015)
 Sex Ed (2013)
 Scoff (2003)
 A Short Film Named Desire (2017)
 Sleeper (2005)
 Something Fishy (2010)
 Strike (2012)
 Stump (2002)
 Submarine (2015)
 Tango Underpants (2014)
 Then She Was Gone (2010)
 Third-World Solution (2015)
 This Is Perth (2009)
 Til 3 Knocks (2008)
 Tinglewood (2009)
 Transmission (2012)
 Two Minds (2010)
 The Umbrella Condition (2005)
 Upside Down (2002)
 Victim (2003)
 Victims (2009)
 Vincent (2012)
 Wait 'Til Your Father Gets Home (2002)
 Watch Comes Around (2004)
 Water (2009)
 We Were Here (2016)
 Why the Long Face? (2007)

Filmmakers 
Past and present Western Australian writers, producers and directors include:

 Britt Arthur
 Jeffory Asselin
 Julius Avery
 Harry Bardwell
 Sam Barrett
 Paul Barron
 Brian Beaton
 Justin Beckett
 Natalie Bell
 Stuart Bender
 Dave Bishop
 Jess Black
 James Bogle
 Gavin Bond
 Michael Bond
 Lauren Brunswick
 Rebecca Caldwell
 Kody Cameron-Brown
 A.J. Carter
 Gary Centrone
 Tania Chambers
 Camille Chen
 Reg Cribb
 Stevie Cruz-Martin
 Arnie Custo
 Sean Robert Daniels
 Pierce Davison
 Mat de Koning
 Tim Dean
 Brendan Dee
 Mark DeFriest
 Alex Dermer
 Eva Di Blasio
 Elissa Down
 Brett Dowson
 Coral Drouyn
 Khrob Edmonds
 Miranda Edmonds
 Lauren Elliott
 Ron Elliott
 Karen Farmer
 Damian Fasolo
 Rai Fazio
 Sam Bodhi Field
 Robert Forsyth
 Hayden Fortescue
 Damien Giglietta
 Pete Gleeson
 James Grandison
 Peter Gurbiel
 Michael Hatch
 Joe Henderson
 Cathy Henkel
 Zak Hilditch
 Mike Hoath
 Richard Hyde
 Henry Inglis
 Ross Ioppolo
 Georgina Isles
 Dean Israelite
 Jimmy Jack
 Alison James
 Kane George Jason
 Corrie Jones
 Aaron Kamp
 Phil Jeng Kane
 David Karsten
 Maya Kavanagh
 Liz Kearney
 Nathan Keene
 Melissa Kelly
 Tenille Kennedy
 Christopher Kenworthy
 Deidre Kitcher
 Paul Komadina
 Nunzio La Bianca
 Maziar Lahooti
 Nelson Lau
 Luna Laure
 Andrew Lewis
 Matty Limpus
 Robert Livings
 Matt Lovkis
 Johnny Ma
 Roderick MacKay
 Kelrick Martin
 Michael McCall
 Stephen McCallum
 Aaron McCann
 Adrian McFarlane
 Ross Metcalf
 Jonathan Messer
 Daniel Monks
 Robyn Marais
 Nathan Mewett
 Pann Murujaiyan
 Carmelo Musca
 Kate Neylon
 Andrew Ogilvie
 Dan Osborn
 Jag Pannu
 Jess Parker
 Dominic Pearce
 James Pentecost
 Vincenzo Perrella
 Levon J Polinelli
 Ruben Pracas
 Adrian Prospero
 Stefan Androv Radanovich
 John Rapsey
 Chris Richards-Scully
 Chris Ridley
 Kirsten Robb
 Melanie Rodriga
 Sarah Rosetti
 Wade K. Savage
 Brooke Silcox
 Angie Smith
 Burleigh Smith
 David Vincent Smith
 Anthea Smyth
 Damien Spiccia
 Grant Sputore
 Robbie Studsor
 John V. Soto
 Nathan Stone
 Curtis Taylor
 Sue Taylor
 Julius Telmer
 Peter Templeman
 Debbie Thoy
 Ross Tinney
 Richard Todd
 Miley Tunnecliffe
 Alexander von Hofmann
 Roslyn Walker
 April Ward
 Antony Webb
 Renée Webster
 Cameron Whiteford
 Keir Wilkins
 Martin Wilson
 Alice Wolfe
 Ella Wright
 Troy Wyatt
 Ben Young

Directors of photography 

 Simon Akkerman (ACS)
 Denson Baker (ACS)
 Ian Batt
 Laetitia Belen
 Ben Berkhout
 Dion Borrett
 A.J. Coultier
 Joel Crane
 Ivan Davidov
 George Davis
 Torstein Dyrting (ACS)
 Jim Frater
 Rusty Geller
 Stewart Hadfield
 Ulrich Krafzik (ACS)
 David Le May (ACS)
 Richard Malins (ACS)
 Michael McDermott
 Andrew McLeod
 Alex McPhee (ACS)
 Ross Metcalf
 Lewis Potts
 David Vincent Smith
 Jason Thomas
 Michael Titter
 Antony Webb
 Sam Winzar
 Mark Zagar (ACS)

Other industry practitioners 

 Vikki Barr (ScreenWest)
 Tony Bective (Luna Cinemas)
 Nick Bertke (Electronic musician, visual effects)
 Rikki Lea Bestall (ScreenWest)
 Paul Bodlovich (FTI)
 Ian Booth (ScreenWest)
 Andre Chang-Fane (Visual effects)
 Michael Cunningham 
 Merlin Eden (Film editor)
 Rusty Geller (Steadicam operator)
 Ash Gibson Greig (Composer)
 James Helm (Actor)
 Ryan Hodgson (ScreenWest)
 Travis Johnson (Film Critic, Filmink, The West Australian, X-Press Magazine) 
 George Karpathakis (ECU)
 Edward McQueen-Mason (Film editor)
 Annie Murtagh-Monks (Casting director, FTI)
 Mark Naglazas (Film critic, The West Australian)
 Andy Parnell (Sound recordist)
 Herbert Pinter (Production designer)
 Peter Pritchard (Film editor)
 Ali Roberts (Acting coach)
 Jack Sargeant (Revelation)
 Helen Shervington (CinefestOZ)
 Lawrie Silvestrin (Film editor)
 Keith Smith (ECU, Revel-8)
 Richard Sowada (Revelation)
 Stephen Sunderland (Film critic)
 Ingrid van den Berghe (Luna Cinemas)
 Robert Woods (Visual effects)

Film schools 

 Curtin University
 Edith Cowan University
 Film and Television Institute (FTI)
 Filmbites
 Murdoch University
 Perth Film School
 SAE Institute
 University of Notre Dame Australia
 WA Screen Academy

See also 

 Australian Directors Guild
 Australian Writers' Guild
 CinefestOZ, a major WA film festival
 Cinema of Australia
 List of films shot in Western Australia
 Lotterywest
 National Film and Sound Archive
 Perth International Arts Festival

References

External links 
 CinefestOZ
 Film and Television Institute (FTI)
 Luna Cinemas
 Perth International Arts Festival
 Revelation Perth International Film Festival
 Screen Australia
 Screenwest

Cinema of Australia
Western Australia
Industry in Australia
Economy of Western Australia